Puebla de Sanabria is a small town located in the north-western part  of the province of Zamora in Spain, between the rivers Tera and Castro.

It is the economic and political centre of the comarca of Sanabria.

History
Well known as one of the oldest settlements in the province of Zamora, its roots could get to be documented around year 509 where it appears in a record from the Council of Lugo.  Some authors have the opinion that the information here found refers to the whole region instead referring only to the town. More accurate documentation can be found around the 10th century in which existed as "urbe Senabrie" indicated as organization center for its surrounding area.

Main sights
the  castle built around the 15th century by the Count of Benavente
Romanesque-Gothic church of  Nuestra Señora de Azogue (13th century)
Hermitage of San Cayetano, in Baroque style (17th century)
Isabeline Town Hall (16th century).
Fort of San Carlos

Notable people
 Jesús Requejo San Román (1880-1936), Catholic activist, politician

See also
Lago de Sanabria

References

External links

 For more information
 Puebla de Sanabria Town Hall
 Puebla de Sanabria in Google Maps
 Fiestas de las Victorias, de Puebla de Sanabria
 Portal de Turismo de Sanabria

Towns in Spain
Municipalities of the Province of Zamora